De'Mond Keith Parker (born December 24, 1976 in Tulsa, Oklahoma) is a former American football running back for the Oklahoma Sooners that had a limited career in the National Football League.

Career
Parker was a standout for the Booker T. Washington Hornets in Tulsa. As a true freshman at Oklahoma, Parker gained over 1,000 yards. He accomplished that feat in each of his three seasons. All three of his seasons rank in the top 20 all-time at Oklahoma.

Parker racked up 291 yards in the 1997 Red River Shootout. Outrushing eventual Heisman Trophy winner Ricky Williams, Parker established the record for the most yards in a single OU-Texas game. 

Parker played for the Sooners from 1996 to 1998, and is the Sooners' eighth all-time leading rusher. 

When Bob Stoops became the third head coach in Parker's tenure at Oklahoma in 1999, Parker decided to forgo his senior season, despite several attempts by Stoops to keep him with the team.  He was taken by the Green Bay Packers with the 159th overall pick in the 5th round of the 1999 NFL Draft. In his only NFL start in 1999, Parker rushed for 135 yards and two touchdowns. He later joined the Detroit Lions, but did not play.

College statistics

References

External links
 CNN/SI 1999 NFL Draft Player Page
 De'mond Parker statistics at SoonerStats.com 

1976 births
Living people
Sportspeople from Tulsa, Oklahoma
American football running backs
Oklahoma Sooners football players
Green Bay Packers players